Molly Hocking (born 14 December 2000) is an English singer. In 2019, she won the eighth series of The Voice UK, winning a recording contract with Polydor Records. Her winning single, a cover of "I'll Never Love Again", reached number 73 on the UK Singles Chart.

Career

2017: The X Factor 
In 2017, Hocking auditioned for The X Factor, and progressed to bootcamp. However, she failed to proceed further and her audition was not televised.

2019: The Voice UK 
In 2019, Hocking auditioned for the eighth series of The Voice UK, and joined Olly Murs's team. After performing "I'll Never Love Again" by Lady Gaga and Bradley Cooper, she was announced as the winner of the series, signing a contract with Polydor Records. Her winner's single reached number 73 on the UK Singles Charts.

2020-present: New music and Up 

On 12 March 2020, Hocking announced her debut single titled "After the Night Before". The release of the single was delayed due to the COVID–19 pandemic, and was eventually released on 6 November 2020, alongside an accompanying music video. Hocking performed the song on the semi-final of ninth series of The Voice UK. On 4 December 2020, it was announced that Hocking will support Olly Murs on his Summer 2021 UK Tour. The singer is no longer signed to Polydor Records.

On 28 May 2021, Hocking released her new song "We Can Have the World Tonight".

On 19 October 2021, Hocking announced her debut EP called Up which was released on 26 October 2021.

On 31 December 2021, Hocking released the song called, "Alive".

On 22 June 2022, Hocking released the song called, "Bones".

Discography

Extended plays

Singles

Concert tours

Supporting
 Olly Murs - Summer Tour

References

2000 births
21st-century English women singers
21st-century English singers
English soul singers
Living people
The Voice (franchise) winners
The Voice UK contestants